The Mayo Correctional Institution Annex is a state prison for men located in Mayo, Lafayette County, Florida. This facility was opened in 1984 and has a maximum capacity of 1345 prisoners.

The original Mayo Correctional Institution on the same property held 1668 prisoners  and was closed by the state in 2012. On June 26, 2019 two inmates were alleged to have attacked a correctional officer with improvised weapons. While responding to the assault, staff reported that another inmate may have been killed in a separate part of the institution. The officer who was allegedly attacked was expected to survive. The officer who was attacked did survive and in January of 2021 was attacked by a different inmate suffering several stab wounds again. He also survived this incident.

References

Prisons in Florida
Buildings and structures in Lafayette County, Florida
1984 establishments in Florida